Christ the King Catholic School is a Catholic private school in Oklahoma City, Oklahoma. Founded in 1949, the school was first run by the Benedictine Sisters. Christ the King operates as a parish school for grades Pre-Kindergarten through Eighth Grade. The principal is Amy Feighny, and its vice principals are Robert Crump and Jenny Richard. Students attend a Catholic Mass every Thursday, and attending Mass on Sunday is widely promoted.
The school's motto is "Where everybody is somebody and all live for God" and its mission statement is "Christ the King Catholic School is committed to upholding Catholic faith and tradition and, in partnership with families, helping students develop academically for a life of faith, integrity and service."

References

External links
Christ the King Catholic School

Roman Catholic Archdiocese of Oklahoma City
Schools in Oklahoma City
Private middle schools in Oklahoma